The Beechcraft Model 16 was an experimental American all-metal low-wing training monoplane designed and built by Beechcraft. The prototype, registered N9716Q, first flew on June 12, 1970, and was the only one built.

References

Citations

Bibliography

0016
Abandoned civil aircraft projects of the United States
1970s United States civil trainer aircraft
Single-engined tractor aircraft
Low-wing aircraft
Aircraft first flown in 1970